Amphipneustes lorioli is a species of sea urchin of the family Temnopleuridae. Their armour is covered with spines. It is placed in the genus Amphipneustes and lives in the sea. Amphipneustes lorioli was first scientifically described in 1901 by Koehler.

See also 
 Amphipneustes davidi
 Amphipneustes koehleri
 Amphipneustes marsupialis

References 

Amphipneustes